María Carmen Maeztu Villafranca (born 1962) is a Navarrese politician, Minister of Social Rights of Navarre since August 2019.

References

1962 births
Spanish Socialist Workers' Party politicians
Government ministers of Navarre
Living people
Politicians from Navarre